Beloved is the first studio album by Jordan Feliz. Centricity Music released the album on October 2, 2015. Feliz worked with Jared Fox, Joshua Silverberg, and Colby Wedgeworth in the production of this album.

Critical reception

Andy Argyrakis, awarding the album four stars from CCM Magazine, says, "The believer’s solo debut disc shows off his seasoned status with redemptive, socially relevant lyrics wound around driving guitars, stomping backbeats and periodic electronics (plus several stripped down alternate versions of tracks for those who learn towards the lighter side of the dial)." Rating the album a nine out of ten by Cross Rhythms, Matt McChlery writes, "This album raises the bar in the CCM scene as it is very contemporary yet uncompromising in the message it preaches." Caitlin Lassiter, giving the album four stars for New Release Today, writes, "Beloved is strikingly well produced and well written...Jordan has crafted a unique sound that's already being noticed by fans and grabs your attention at first listen." Awarding the album four stars at 365 Days of Inspiring Media, Jonathan Andre states, "While Jordan has made the transition from being in the rock/metal genre, to acoustic/pop/CCM; it is his lyrics of honest transparency and his passion to create music that’ll impact those around him". Andrew Greenhalgh, reviewing the album from Soul-Audio, writes, "With a soulful sound that is obviously true to himself, Feliz brings forth lyrics of hope and encouragement while not compromising on the creative end."

Track listing

Chart performance

References

2015 debut albums
Jordan Feliz albums
Centricity Music albums